In the IBM System/360 storage architecture, the Volume Table of Contents (VTOC), is a data structure that provides a way of locating the data sets that reside on a particular DASD volume. With the exception of the IBM Z compatible disk layout in Linux on Z, it is the functional equivalent of the MS/PC DOS File Allocation Table (FAT), the Windows NT Master File Table (MFT), and the equivalent structure in, e.g., a Linux file system. The VTOC is not used to contain any IPLTEXT and does not have any role in the IPL process, therefore does not have any data used by or functionally equivalent to the MBR. It lists the names of each data set on the volume as well as size, location, and permissions.  Additionally, it contains an entry for every area of contiguous free space on the volume.  The third record on the first track of the first cylinder of any DASD (e.g., disk) volume is known as the volume label and must contain a pointer to the location of the VTOC. The location of the VTOC may be specified when the volume is initialized. For performance reasons it may be located as close to the center of the volume as possible, since it is referenced frequently. A VTOC is added to a DASD volume when it is initialized using the Device Support Facilities program, ICKDSF, in current systems.

When in OS/360 and successors allocates a data set, it generally searches the catalog to determine the volumes on which it resides. When a program opens a Direct Access Storage Device (DASD) dataset, the OPEN routine searches the VTOC index (VTOCIX) if there is one, or directly searches the VTOC if there is no VTOCIX.

Data Set Control Block types
The VTOC consists of a sequence of 140-byte records known as Data Set Control Blocks (DSCBs). There are ten types of DSCB.

The VTOC must reside within the first 64K tracks on the volume, and The first DSCB in the VTOC is always a format 4 DSCB which describes the VTOC itself and attributes of the DASD volume on which this VTOC resides. The second DSCB is always a format 5 DSCB which describes free space within the VTOC. Normally, the rest of the VTOC will contain format 0 DSCBs, which are empty entries, and format 1 or format 3 DSCBs, which describe the extents of data sets, giving their start address and end address of up to 16 such extents on disk. The initial part of a data set is described by a format 1 DSCB. If necessary, format 3 DSCBs are used to describe further extents of the data set. When a data set is deleted, its format 1 DSCB is overwritten to become a format 0 DSCB, and the format 3 DSCB, if one exists, is similarly deleted.

Originally, a VTOC search was a sequential scan of the DSCBs, stopping when the correct format 1 DSCB was found or the end of the VTOC was reached. As DASD volumes became larger, VTOC search became a bottleneck and so a VTOC index was added.

Format 1 DSCB
This VTOC entry describes a dataset and defines its first three extents. This is the format of the DSCB from OS/360 Release 21.7 in 1973, prior to changes for Y2K.

See also 
 Data Control Block (DCB)
 Count Key Data (CKD)
 Master Boot Record (MBR on PCs)

Notes

References

External links
 z/OS DFSMS: Using Data Sets
 z/OS: DFSMSdfp Advanced Services
 

IBM mainframe operating systems
IBM storage software
File system management
IBM file systems